In Finland, life imprisonment is the maximum criminal penalty. In actual practice, life imprisonment rarely lasts for the remainder of a convict's life; it currently consists of imprisonment in closed prison and possible periods of imprisonment in a halfway house, supervised parole and full parole. The death penalty was abolished in Finland in 1949 for peacetime offences and for all offences in 1972.

Life imprisonment is the only possible penalty for the crime of murder and a possible penalty for high treason, treason, espionage, war crimes, genocide, crimes against humanity, homicidal acts of terrorism, and crime against peace.

Under the Finnish criminal code of 1889, life imprisonment consisted of at least 12 years of imprisonment after which the convict was conditionally released and remained on probation for the rest of their life. After 1931, release was by presidential pardon and the probationary period was eight years. Today, those sentenced to life imprisonment may be considered for parole after 12 years and most are released after serving between 12 and 20 years.

Since 2006, Helsinki Court of Appeals (Helsingin hovioikeus) has acted as Parole Board and a life prisoner has been considered for parole even after serving 10 years. If the parole is rejected, a new parole hearing is scheduled in 2 years. If the parole is accepted, 3 years of supervised parole follows until full parole, assuming no violations. If the convict was less than 21 years of age when they committed the crime, the first parole hearing is after 10 years served. Juveniles cannot be sentenced to life imprisonment in Finland, the maximum penalty for an offender who was under 18 years of age is 12 years for a single murder and 15 years for multiple murders or sentences where a murder conviction is combined with conviction for other serious crimes.

As of 2017, the longest incarceration for a life sentence convict in Finland has been 22 years. The paroled offender committed another murder the following month and was again sentenced to life imprisonment. The average duration of a life sentence in the 2010s has been 14 years.

References

Finland
Law of Finland